A Party Committee Secretary is the leader of the Chinese Communist Party (CCP) organization in a province, city, village, or other administrative unit. In most cases, it is the de facto highest political office of its area of jurisdiction. The term can also be used for the leadership position of CCP organizations in state-owned enterprises, private companies, foreign-owned companies, universities, research institutes, hospitals, as well as other institutions of the state.

Post-Cultural Revolution, the CCP is responsible for the formulation of policies and the government is responsible for its day-to-day execution. At every level of jurisdiction, a government leader serves alongside the party secretary. For example, in the case of a province, the provincial Party Secretary is the de facto highest office, but the government is headed by a government leader called a "Governor". The Governor is usually the second-highest-ranking official in the party's Provincial Committee, and holds the concurrent title of "Deputy Party Committee Secretary". A similar comparison can be made for municipal Party Secretaries and Mayors.

There have been rare instances where both Party Secretary and Governor (or Mayor) positions were held by the same person, though this is not the common practice since the end of the Cultural Revolution. The Party Secretary is usually assisted by numerous Deputy Party Secretaries.

Until the 1980s, the leading position of a local party organization was called the First Secretary, its deputy the "Second Secretary". The local party organizations each had its own Secretariat with numerous secretaries.

Party-government organization hierarchy

Beginning at the provincial level, China's party-government dual administrative system arranges a hierarchy by which the party chief is in charge of determining the direction of policy as well as personnel changes, and the corresponding government leader is responsible for implementing party policy and arranging the annual budget, as well as other everyday government matters and ceremonial tasks. The list of party chief levels is as follows:

At the central level, the party chief is known as CCP Central Committee General Secretary, while the corresponding government position is known as Premier.
At the provincial level, the party chief is known as CCP Provincial Committee Secretary, while the corresponding government position is known as Governor.
At the prefecture or municipal level, the party chief is known as CCP Municipal Committee Secretary, while the corresponding government position is known as Mayor.
At the county level, the party chief is known as CCP County Committee Secretary, while the corresponding government position is known as the County Governor.
At the township level, the party chief is known as CCP Township/Town Committee Secretary, while the corresponding government position is known as the Magistrate.
At the village level, the local party chief, known as the Village Party Branch Secretary heads a committee of around ten people to make executive decisions related to the village. The process is not entirely formal, and therefore the party chief at this level is not considered part of the Chinese civil service.

The Communist Party secretaries at the provincial level also often serve as the chair of the provincial people's congress. Generally, a top government official (the mayor, governor) will also hold the first deputy party chief position.

Deputy Party Committee Secretary 

A Deputy Party Secretary assists in the work of the Party Secretary. In provincial and most prefecture-level jurisdictions, there are two deputy party chiefs. The higher-ranked deputy party chief is generally also concurrently the head of the government of the party committee's area of jurisdiction. The other deputy party chief is known as the zhuanzhi fushuji, literally, "Specifically-designated Deputy Party Secretary." Generally, the zhuanzhi deputy party chief is also the head of the party school of any given jurisdiction. For example, in Sichuan province, the Party Secretary heads the party committee, while the Governor of Sichuan serves as the top ranked deputy party chief, and the "specifically-designated" deputy party chief ranks immediately next to the governor in precedence.

Party Branch Secretary 

A "Party Branch" or "Party Group" (党组; dangzu) exists in almost all institutions of state which are not formally part of the Communist Party organization. These include government organs, People's Congresses, ministries, provincial and municipal departments and so on. These organizations are created by mandate of a Party Committee, serve to ensure that the general policy guidelines of the party is followed at each respective institution. They may gather for ad hoc meetings to study party documents or speeches or carry out "party life meetings" at their respective institutions, but they do not serve as an executive body in the domains which they reside.

The Party Branch Secretary or Party Group Secretary (党组书记; dangzu shuji) is a distinct office from that of the Party Committee Secretary. They do not have the elaborate organization and bureaucracy that is commonplace with a Party Committee. Unlike Party Committees, which report to parent Party Committees at a higher level of jurisdiction, Party Branches are responsible to the Party Committee that mandated its creation.

Some ministries do not have Communist Party members serving as ministers. In some ministries, the Party Branch Secretary is subordinate to the Minister. A Party Branch Secretary may be assisted by one or multiple Deputy Party Branch Secretaries.

A prominent example of the Party Branch Secretary position is that of the State Council, China's government. The Premier almost always serves simultaneously as the Party Branch Secretary of the State Council. The State Council does not have a Party Committee.

See also 

 Chinese Communist Party Deputy Committee Secretary
 Chinese Communist Party Provincial Standing Committee

References 

Committee Secretary
Committee Secretary
Committee Secretary